Valtat is a surname. Notable people with the surname include:

 Jean-Christophe Valtat, French writer and teacher
 Jules Édouard Valtat, French sculptor
 Louis Valtat, French painter and printmaker associated with the Fauves

See also
Valta  (disambiguation)

French-language surnames